European Motocross Championship is the European championship of motocross racing, organized by the FIM Europe, from 1988.

Categories
Since 2014 the 65cc, 85cc, 125cc, 150cc, 250cc, 300cc and Open classes have taken on the names EMX 65, EMX 85, EMX 125, EMX 250, EMX 300 and EMX Open.

Winners
Update to end of the 2020 season.

Discontinued
2001:  Cyrille Coulon (125cc junior),  Miroslav Kucirek (open junior)
2002:  Jaka Moze (125cc junior);  Juss Laansoo (open junior)
2003:  Josef Kulhavy (125cc junior)
2004:  Ivo Šteinbergs (125cc junior)
2005:  Nicolai Hansen (125cc junior)
2006:  Marco Maddii (125cc junior)
2007:  Klemen Gerčar (125cc junior)
2008:  Priit Rätsep (125cc junior)
2010:  Jordi Tixier (125cc 2 stroke)
2011:  Simone Zecchina (125cc 2 stroke)
2014:  Albie Wilkie (150cc 4 stroke)
2019:  Stephanie Laier (Women),  Martine Hughes (Women 125)

See also
 FIM Europe
 Motocross World Championship

Notes

References

External links
 
 CHAMPIONNATS D'EUROPE de MOTOCROSS : Podiums finals des principales catégories depuis 1988 

 
Fédération Internationale de Motocyclisme
Motorcycle off-road racing series